Bay Area Medical Center is a 99-bed general acute care hospital located in Marinette, Wisconsin.

Bay Area Medical Center was constructing a new facility in Marinette.

References

Hospitals in Wisconsin
Buildings and structures in Marinette County, Wisconsin